Harrison Jean "Jim" Kaiser (August 15, 1899 – February 23, 1974) was an American football, basketball, and baseball coach and college athletics administrator.  He served as the head football coach at State Teachers College in Lock Haven—now known as Lock Haven University of Pennsylvania—from 1931 to 1933 and at the Teachers College of Connecticut—now known as Central Connecticut State University—from 1935 to 1947, compiling career college football coaching record of 49–20–8.

Early life and playing career
A native of Wells, Minnesota, Kaiser attended North Central College in Naperville, Illinois, where he won 13 varsity letters, in football, basketball, baseball, and track.

Coaching career

Lock Haven
Kaiser was the head football coach at State Teachers College in Lock Haven—now known as Lock Haven University of Pennsylvania—from 1931 to 1933.  His 1933 team outscored opponents by a total of 240 to 22 and achieved seven shutouts.

Central Connecticut
Kaiser was the first head coach at the Teachers College of Connecticut—now known as Central Connecticut State University—in New Britain, Connecticut, serving from 1935 to 1947.  Central Connecticut did not field a football team from 1942 to 1945 due to World War II.

Head coaching record

Football

References

External links
 

1899 births
1974 deaths
American men's basketball coaches
Basketball coaches from Minnesota
Basketball players from Minnesota
Central Connecticut Blue Devils athletic directors
Central Connecticut Blue Devils baseball coaches
Central Connecticut Blue Devils football coaches
Central Connecticut Blue Devils men's basketball coaches
College men's basketball head coaches in the United States
Lock Haven Bald Eagles football coaches
Lock Haven Bald Eagles men's basketball coaches
North Central Cardinals baseball players
North Central Cardinals football players
North Central Cardinals men's basketball players
College men's track and field athletes in the United States
People from Wells, Minnesota